Gaotang Sheng (206 BC–8 AD), courtesy name Bo, was a Confucian scholar of the Western Han. He was from today's Qufu, Shandong. An expert on the ritual classics, he is credited with passing on the Yili.

He was an ancestor of Cao Wei official Gaotang Long.

References 

Han dynasty classicists
People from Qufu
206 BC births
AD 8 deaths